Eternity is a 2018 Peruvian drama film directed by Óscar Catacora. It was selected as the Peruvian entry for the Best Foreign Language Film at the 91st Academy Awards, but it was not nominated. It is the first film to be done entirely in the Aymara language.

Plot
An elderly couple, Willka (Vicente Catacora) and Phaxsi (Rosa Nina) preserve their religion and traditions. After the emigration of their only son, they are left abandoned. Despite this, they never lose hope and wait for him to return, some day.

See also
 List of submissions to the 91st Academy Awards for Best Foreign Language Film
 List of Peruvian submissions for the Academy Award for Best Foreign Language Film

References

External links
 

2018 films
2018 drama films
Peruvian drama films
2010s Peruvian films
Aymara-language films